The Prize of the Christoph and Stephan Kaske Foundation is an annual award for promotion of new music. It was founded in 1988 by Karlheinz and Christiane Kaske in memory of their sons Christoph and Stephan.  has its legal seat in Munich. The aim is to promote young, promising interpreters and composers in the field of new music. The award is endowed with € 10,000. The selection of the winner is made by a board of trustees.

Recipients

 1989: Hans Peter Haller
 1990: Pierre Boulez
 1991: Steffen Schleiermacher
 1993: György Ligeti
 1994: André Richard
 1995: 
 1996: Wolfgang Rihm
 1997: Mario Davidovsky
 1998: Hans-Jürgen von Bose
 1999: Gottfried Michael Koenig
 2000: Péter Eötvös
 2001: Kaija Saariaho
 2002: Christoph Poppen
 2004: 
 2004: Mateusz Bien
 2005: Márton Illés
 2006: Mark Andre
 2007: Jörg Widmann
 2008: Konstantia Gourzi
 2008: 
 2009: Enno Poppe
 2010: Wilhelm Killmayer
 2011: Adriana Hölszky
 2013: Josef Anton Riedl
 2013: Nico Sauer
 2013: Luis Codera Puzo
 2014: Isabel Mundry
 2015: Erkki-Sven Tüür
 2015: Klarenz Barlow
 2015: Curtis Roads
 2016: Georges Aperghis
 2017: Anna Korsun
 2018: Mikis Theodorakis
 2019: Olga Neuwirth
 2020: Peter Michael Hamel
 2022:

References

External links
 

German music awards
Classical music awards
Awards established in 1988